Kevin Long is a graphic artist best known for his airbrush paintings and black-and-white illustrations in the genres of science fiction and fantasy. He was a principal artist at Palladium Books from 1986 until 1995 and served as one of the original contributors to the Rifts role-playing game (RPG) series.

Biography 
Kevin Long grew up in Battle Creek, Michigan and attended the College for Creative Studies in Detroit, where he majored in advertising illustration. Upon graduating, Long worked in the local advertising industry. Having completed a five-year stint in his chosen profession, he was lured away by the artistic and creative freedom offered by Palladium Books. While there, Long built his reputation as one of the most popular illustrators in the role-playing industry. In addition to having created the dynamic look of various characters, vehicles, and equipment in Rifts, he co-authored a number of other Palladium RPG titles. However, Long left Palladium in August 1995 for unspecified reasons.

In October 1997, Raven Software hired Long as a 2-D artist. He was responsible for some of the graphics in Hexen II: Portal of Praevus (1998), Heretic II (1998), Soldier of Fortune (2000), Star Trek: Voyager – Elite Force (2000), Soldier of Fortune II: Double Helix (2002), and Quake 4 (2005). In 2007, Long was the Art Lead on Wolfenstein.

Role-playing game credits 
Works are listed in order of publication date within their respective categories.

Palladium Books

Beyond the Supernatural 
  [Out of Print] – Interior art.
  [Out of Print] – Additional text and ideas, interior art and photographs.
  – Interior art.

Heroes Unlimited
  [Out of Print] – Coauthor, cover and interior art.
  [Out of Print] – Cover art.
  – Additional text and concepts, interior art.
  – Interior art.
  – Cover art.
  – Interior art.
  – Coauthor, interior art.

Macross II 
  [Out of Print] – Cover art.
  [Out of Print] – Cover art.
  [Out of Print] – Cover art.
  [Out of Print] – Cover art.

Nightbane 
  – Interior art [uncredited].
  – Interior art [uncredited].

Palladium Fantasy Role-Playing Game 
  [Out of Print] – Coauthor, additional art.
  [Out of Print] – Cover art.
  – Interior art.
  – Interior art [uncredited].
  – Interior art.
  – Interior art.
  – Additional text and concepts, interior art.

Rifts 
Core
  [Out of Print] – Interior art and paintings.
  – Interior art, Rifts logo design.
World
  – [Out of Print] Cover and interior art.
  – Interior art.
  – Interior art.
  – Additional text and ideas, cover and interior art.
  – Additional designs and concepts, cover and interior art.
  – Interior art.
  – Additional concepts, interior art.
  – Interior art [uncredited].
  – Cover art; interior art [uncredited].
  – Interior art [uncredited].
  – Interior art.
  – Interior art [uncredited].
  – Interior art [uncredited].
  – Interior art [uncredited].
  – Interior art [uncredited].
  – Interior art.
  – Interior art.
  – Interior art.
  – Interior art [uncredited].
  – Contributing artist.
  – Interior art.
Dimension
  – Interior art [uncredited].
  – Cover and interior art.
  – Cover and interior art.
Source
  [Out of Print] – Cover and interior art.
  – Cover and interior art.
  – Cover and interior art.
  – Cover and interior art.
  – Interior art.
  – Interior art.
Conversion
  [Out of Print] – Cover and additional art.
  – Interior art.
  – Cover and additional art.
  – Interior art.
Other
  – Cover and interior art.
  [Out of Print] – Interior art.
  – Cover and interior art.
  – Interior art [uncredited].
  – Interior art.
  – Interior art.
  – Interior art [uncredited].

Robotech 

  [Out of Print] – Cover and interior art.
  [Out of Print] – Cover and interior art.
  [Out of Print] – Cover art.
  [Out of Print] – Cover and interior art.
  [Out of Print] – Cover art.
  [Out of Print] – Cover and additional art.
  [Out of Print] – Cover and interior art.
  [Out of Print] – Cover and additional art.
  [Out of Print] – Additional text and ideas, cover and interior art.
  [Out of Print] – Interior art.
  [Out of Print] – Cover and interior art.
  [Out of Print] – Cover art.
  – Interior art.

Teenage Mutant Ninja Turtles 
  [Out of Print] – Cover art.
  [Out of Print] – Cover art.
  [Out of Print] – Cover and interior art.

The Rifter 
  [Out of Print] – Cover and interior art.
  [Out of Print] – Interior art.
  [Out of Print] – Interior art.
  [Out of Print] – Cover art.
  [Out of Print] – Interior art [uncredited].
  [Out of Print] – Interior art [uncredited].
  [Out of Print] – Cover art.
  [Out of Print] – Interior art [uncredited].
  [Out of Print] – Interior art [uncredited].
  [Out of Print] – Interior art [uncredited].
  [Out of Print] – Interior art [uncredited].
  [Out of Print] – Interior art [uncredited].
  [Out of Print] – Cover art; interior art [uncredited].
  [Out of Print] – Cover art.
  [Out of Print] – Interior art [uncredited].
  – Interior art [uncredited].
  – Interior art.
  – Cover and interior art.
  – Cover art.
  – Cover art.
  – Interior art.
  – Interior art.
  – Interior art.

Miscellaneous 
  [Out of Print] – Cover art.
  [Out of Print] – Cover, armour, castle, and additional art.
  – Interior art.
  – Additional art.
  – Interior art.
  [Out of Print] – Cover art.
  – Interior art [uncredited].

Shadowrun 
  (SKU 7322) [Out of Print] – Interior art.
  (SKU 7906) [Out of Print] – Interior art.
  (SKU 7910) – Interior art.
  (SKU 10662) – Interior art.

Other games 
  – Interior art.

Notes

References

External links
 Kevin Long :: Pen & Paper RPG Database archive

American illustrators
American speculative fiction artists
Fantasy artists
Living people
Megaverse (Palladium Books)
People from Battle Creek, Michigan
Role-playing game artists
Science fiction artists
Video game artists
Year of birth missing (living people)